Etna Furnace may refer to:
 Etna, Lawrence County, Ohio, an unincorporated community sometimes called Etna Furnace
 Etna Furnace (Williamsburg, Pennsylvania), listed on the NRHP in Williamsburg, Pennsylvania